Stavropol Soviet Republic (Russian: Ставропольская Советская Республика [Stavropol’skaja Sovetskaja Respublika]) (January 1–July 7, 1918) was part of the RSFSR in the territory of Stavropol Guberniya of the Imperial Russia. Its capital was Stavropol.
It was merged into the North Caucasian Soviet Republic.

References 

Subdivisions of the Russian Soviet Federative Socialist Republic
Early Soviet republics
States and territories established in 1918
Stavropol Krai
Former socialist republics
Post–Russian Empire states